We Need to Talk About Kevin is a 2003 novel by Lionel Shriver, published by Serpent's Tail, about a fictional school massacre. It is written from the first person perspective of the teenage killer's mother, Eva Khatchadourian, and documents her attempt to come to terms with her psychopathic son Kevin and the murders he committed, as told in a series of letters from Eva to her husband. 

The novel, Shriver's seventh, won the 2005 Orange Prize, a UK-based prize for female authors of any country writing in English. In 2011 the novel was adapted into a film.

Plot
Even before her son Kevin was born, Eva Khatchadourian struggled with parenthood and a sense of ambivalence about becoming a mother. Owing to the fact that Kevin was a difficult infant and child, she gave up her successful career as a writer and publisher of travel guides in order to concentrate on raising him. Something has gone wrong, however, because her son has developed sinister psychopathic traits, though his father, Franklin Plaskett, refuses to acknowledge the problem. As the situation turns catastrophic, Eva tries to figure out where she and Franklin went wrong.

In the wake of a school massacre committed by the 15-year-old Kevin, Eva begins writing letters to Franklin in November 2000. She reflects candidly on the history of her relationship with her husband and the events of Kevin's life up to the killings. She also relates her current life: she was involved in both her son's criminal trial and a civil action against her (for parental negligence) brought by the mother of one of her son's victims. Eva sold the family home to pay legal expenses, but in order to be near Claverack Juvenile Correctional Facility where Kevin is incarcerated, she still lives in the same town and is shunned by the community. She regularly visits Kevin in prison, where they have a cold relationship.

Eva reluctantly stepped back from her career to raise Kevin, and the two have long been locked in a battle of wills. Kevin seemingly regards everyone, especially his mother, with contempt and hatred, yet pretends to be manageable when Franklin is around. Eva perceives him as deliberately antagonistic, with his behavior ranging from seemingly petty sabotage of Eva's belongings to possibly encouraging a girl to gouge her eczema-affected skin. Kevin resisted toilet training, which Eva reveals led her to lash out and break Kevin's arm; Kevin told Franklin this was an accident and has used the secret to manipulate Eva.

When Kevin is severely ill as a child, he briefly accepts Eva's care for the first time and rejects Franklin, seemingly too tired to put on an act of apathy. Eva reads Robin Hood to him and he takes pleasure in learning archery after he recovers, but seems otherwise unable to relate to human passion. As he grows older, he also takes an interest in manipulating his sycophantic friend Leonard, engaging in vandalism, and collecting computer viruses on floppy disks. He unsettles his peers, expresses his disdain for convention by wearing uncomfortably undersized clothes, and follows news of school shooters and mass murderers. In high school, Kevin, Leonard, and two other boys accuse their drama teacher of sexual abuse; Eva is convinced he orchestrated the false accusations.

As Kevin's behavior worsens, Franklin defends him, convinced that his son is normal and often misunderstood. Kevin plays the part of a loving, sensitive son whenever Franklin is around. Eva's apparent dislike of her son and their distrust create a rift between the couple. They have a second child, Celia, whom Franklin believes Eva favors. Kevin is often aggressive to Celia and takes advantage of her affectionate nature. When Celia is six years old, her pet rodent disappears and shortly later the kitchen sink is clogged, which Eva clears with a caustic drain cleaner. While Kevin is babysitting Celia, she supposedly finds the cleaner and accidentally destroys her eye and scars her face. Eva is certain she put the cleaner away and that Kevin attacked Celia. This accusation leads Franklin to ask for a divorce, intending to take custody of Kevin; Kevin overhears them.

When Eva relates the story of the massacre itself, it is finally revealed that Franklin and Celia are dead. Kevin had killed them both at home with his crossbow before going to his school, where he lured and trapped seven classmates, a cafeteria worker, and a teacher in a gymnasium and attacked them. Eva speculates that he did this because separation in the divorce would deny him a final victory over his mother, or to avoid being trapped in performing normalcy for Franklin. She also believes he selected people he resented for having interests they were passionate about for his victims. Kevin ensured a light sentence by timing the attack for three days before his 16th birthday in order to be charged as a minor and by using a prescription for Prozac to argue that he was experiencing violent psychotic side effects.

The novel ends on the second anniversary of the massacre, shortly before Kevin will turn eighteen and be transferred to Sing Sing, a maximum security prison. Subdued and frightened, he gives Celia's prosthetic eye to Eva and apologizes. Eva asks Kevin for the first time why he committed the murders, and Kevin replies that he is no longer sure. They embrace, and Eva concludes that, despite what he did, she loves her son, and she awaits the day he is released and she can welcome him home.

Themes
Shriver focuses on the relative importance of innate characteristics and personal experiences in determining character and behavior, primarily in regard to Kevin. The book is particularly concerned with the possibility that Eva's ambivalence toward maternity may have influenced Kevin's development. Shriver also identifies American optimism and "high-hopes-crushed" as one of the novel's primary themes, as represented by Franklin, the narrator's husband, who serves as "the novel's self-willed optimist about the possibility of a happy family."

Adaptations

Film adaptation

In 2005 BBC Films acquired the rights to adapt the book as a film. Director Lynne Ramsay signed on to direct. It was announced in March 2009 that Tilda Swinton had signed on to star in the film as Eva. Filming began on location in Stamford, Connecticut on April 19, 2010. We Need To Talk About Kevin was screened at the Toronto International Film Festival on September 9 and 11, 2011. John C. Reilly plays Franklin and Ezra Miller plays Kevin.  The film premiered In Competition at the 2011 Cannes Film Festival, where it was met with praise from film critics.

Radio adaptation
From January 7, 2008, the story was serialized on BBC Radio 4 in 10 15-minute episodes and was broadcast daily as the Woman's Hour drama. It starred Madeleine Potter as Eva Katchadourian. Ethan Brooke and Nathan Nolan played Kevin at various ages, while Richard Laing played Franklin Plaskett. It is occasionally repeated on BBC Radio 4 Extra.

References

External links

Podcast of Lionel Shriver discussing We Need to Talk About Kevin on the BBC's World Book Club.
Interview with the author from Salon.com
BBC Radio 4 interview with Shriver on the book
Information on the book from the publisher, Serpent's Tail

2003 American novels
American crime novels
American novels adapted into films
Books by Lionel Shriver
Epistolary novels
Fiction with unreliable narrators
Novels about mass murder
Novels adapted into radio programs
Novels set in New York (state)
Patricide in fiction
Sororicide in fiction
Women's Prize for Fiction-winning works
Counterpoint (publisher) books